Hsu Yao-chang (born 30 June 1955) is a Taiwanese politician. He represented Miaoli County in the Legislative Yuan from 2002 to 2014, when he was elected Magistrate of Miaoli County.

Education
Hsu graduated from the Chin-Min Institute of Technology and completed his master's degree in industrial and commercial management at Chung Hua University.

Political career

Hsu served as a legislator from 2002 to 2014. He declared his candidacy for the Miaoli County magistracy  on 8 January 2014 at Toufen Elementary School in Toufen Township, Miaoli County. He was accompanied by his wife and other officials. Toufen Township chief Hsu Ting-chen said that Hsu would be able to expedite the development of the county due to his abundant experience and knowledge of the area.

Miaoli County Magistracy

2014 Miaoli County magistrate election
Hsu was elected as the Magistrate of Miaoli County on 29 November 2014, defeating Democratic Progressive Party candidate Wu Yi-chen.

2016 Mainland China visit
In September 2016, Hsu with another seven magistrates and mayors from Taiwan visited Beijing, which were Chiu Ching-chun (Magistrate of Hsinchu County), Liu Cheng-ying (Magistrate of Lienchiang County), Yeh Hui-ching (Deputy Mayor of New Taipei City), Chen Chin-hu (Deputy Magistrate of Taitung County), Lin Ming-chen (Magistrate of Nantou County), Fu Kun-chi (Magistrate of Hualien County) and Wu Cherng-dean (Deputy Magistrate of Kinmen County). Their visit was aimed to reset and restart cross-strait relations after President Tsai Ing-wen took office on 20 May 2016. The eight local leaders reiterated their support of One-China policy under the 1992 consensus. They met with Taiwan Affairs Office Head Zhang Zhijun and Chairperson of the Chinese People's Political Consultative Conference Yu Zhengsheng.

2018 Miaoli County magistrate election
The Kuomintang endorsed Hsu for a second term as Miaoli County magistrate in December 2017.

Hsu was term-limited and ineligible for the Miaoli County magisterial post in the 2022 local election. The Kuomintang nominated , who led the Irrigation and Water Conservancy Association and Irrigation Agency in Miaoli.

References

External links

 

Kuomintang Members of the Legislative Yuan in Taiwan
Living people
1955 births
Members of the 8th Legislative Yuan
Members of the 5th Legislative Yuan
Members of the 6th Legislative Yuan
Members of the 7th Legislative Yuan
Miaoli County Members of the Legislative Yuan
Magistrates of Miaoli County
People involved in plagiarism controversies